Ras Burqa, (“head of the blessing” in Arabic) is a small bay on the Red Sea in the district of Nuwaiba, Egypt.

In 1985, Suleiman Khater, a lone Egyptian gunman, perpetrated the Ras Burqa massacre, killing eight people.

See also
 List of cities and towns in Egypt

References

Populated places in South Sinai Governorate